Novoalexandrovka is a rural locality (a village) in Pisarevsky Selsoviet, Sharansky District, Bashkortostan, Russia. The population was 11 as of 2010. There is 1 street.

Geography 
Novoalexandrovka is located 33 km north of Sharan (the district's administrative centre) by road. Novoknyazevo is the nearest rural locality.

References 

Rural localities in Sharansky District